Ucar or UCAR may refer to:
 University Corporation for Atmospheric Research, a U.S. organization of atmospheric research institutions
 Unmanned Combat Armed Rotorcraft, a United States pilotless attack helicopter, currently under development
 Ujar Rayon, a province in Azerbaijan
 Ucar, Azerbaijan, capital of that region
 Úcar, a municipality in the province of Navarre, Spain
 Uçar, Turkish surname
 U-Car, a type of race car built from stock parts
 Godfrey Chitalu, Legendary Zambian footballer and coach
 Gabriel Ucar Swedish football player
 A European brand name for consumer batteries formerly developed by Union Carbide.